Stella Maris College may refer to:

 Stella Maris Presentation College, a parent college of Nagle Catholic College in Geraldton, Australia
 Stella Maris College, a parent college of Chanel College in Gladstone, Australia
 Stella Maris College (Frankston), in Melbourne, Australia
 Stella Maris College, Manly, in Sydney, Australia
 Stella Maris College, Chennai, in Chennai, India
 Stella Maris College (Malta), a Lasallian educational institution in Malta
 Stella Maris College (Meerssen), in Meerssen, the Netherlands
 Stella Maris College (Valkenburg), in Valkenburg aan de Geul, the Netherlands
 Stella Maris College, Port Harcourt, Nigeria
 Stella Maris College Quezon City, in the Philippines
 Stella Maris College, Nkokonjeru, Uganda
 Stella Maris College (Montevideo), in Montevideo, Uruguay

See also
 Stella Maris (disambiguation)